Samir Kherbouche (born January 28, 1976) is an Algerian football player. He has played for Algeria national team.

National team statistics

References

1976 births
Algeria international footballers
Algerian footballers
Algeria under-23 international footballers
CA Batna players
JSM Béjaïa players
Living people
MO Béjaïa players
OMR El Annasser players
People from Tlemcen
WA Tlemcen players
Amal Bou Saâda players
Competitors at the 1997 Mediterranean Games
Association football defenders
Mediterranean Games competitors for Algeria
21st-century Algerian people
20th-century Algerian people